George R. Roberts (1766 – 14 January 1861) was an American privateer in the War of 1812.

Aboard the Sarah Ann 

He began his career as a privateer in July 1812, a month after the start of the war, sailing from his native Baltimore on Captain Richard Moon's privateer Sarah Ann. The next month, in the Bahamas, their ship attacked and captured a British ship transiting from Kingston, Jamaica to London, England and brought its cargo of sugar and coffee to Savannah, Georgia. Back in the Bahamas on 13 September 1812, the Sarah Ann was captured by HMS Redbridge. Roberts was among six sailors accused of being British deserters, but Captain Moon asserted him "a native born of the United States [with] every sufficient document, together with free papers."

Aboard the Chasseur 

Released from British custody and back in Baltimore, in July 1814 he signed on as a gunner under Captain Thomas Boyle on the privateer Chasseur, called the "Pride of Baltimore." After sinking seventeen ships and engaging in an improbable singlehanded blockade of Great Britain, the Chasseur returned, passing Fort McHenry on 8 April 1815, with Roberts and the other crew welcomed as war heroes. According to Boyle, Roberts "displayed the most intrepid courage."

Later life 

In civilian life Roberts worked as a sawyer and laborer, living in numerous locations, many in Fell's Point. At his death on 14 January 1861 he was remembered in the Baltimore Sun:

References

Further reading 
Archives of Maryland (Biographical Series) George R Roberts (b. ? - d. 1861)

1766 births
1861 deaths
People from Baltimore
American privateers